Novaya Malykla is a rural locality (a selo) and the administrative center of Novomalyklinsky District, Ulyanovsk Oblast, Russia. Population:

References

Notes

Sources

Rural localities in Ulyanovsk Oblast